Antari is a town and a nagar panchayat in Gwalior district  in the state of Madhya Pradesh, India.

Demographics
 India census, Antari had a population of 9534. Males constitute 53% of the population and females 47%. Antari has an average literacy rate of 53%, lower than the national average of 59.5%; with 66% of the males and 34% of females literate. 16% of the population is under 6 years of age.

References

Cities and towns in Gwalior district